Douglas James Curtin (born 15 September 1947) is a Welsh former professional footballer who played in the Football League for Mansfield Town.

References

1947 births
Living people
Welsh footballers
Association football forwards
English Football League players
Cardiff City F.C. players
Mansfield Town F.C. players